Barbuda is an island in the Caribbean.

Barbuda may also refer to:

 Antigua and Barbuda, the country that Barbuda is contained within, also sometimes called "Barbuda"
 Barbuda Council, the government of Barbuda Island
 Luiz Jorge de Barbuda (1564-1613) Portuguese cartographer

Other uses
 Barbuda Codrington Airport, the Barbuda public airport

See also
 Barbudan (disambiguation)
 Antigua (disambiguation)
 Barbados (disambiguation)
 Bermuda (disambiguation)